The Oshan CX70 or previously the Chana CX70 is a 7-seater rear-wheel drive mid-size crossover produced by Changan Automobile under the Oshan brand.

Overview
The Chana CX70 debuted on the 2016 Beijing Auto Show and was launched on the Chinese auto market right after with prices ranging from 68,900 yuan to 84,900 yuan. The CX70 is manufactured by Chana, Changan's commercial division, also later known as Oushang. Oushang was known for producing minivans and mini MPVs, making the CX70 the first crossover of the brand. A turbocharged version called the Chana CX70T was also available, with styling changes on the grilles, with an asymmetrical design positioning the brand logo on the right half of the grilles heavily inspired by Land Rover.

Powertrain
Powering the CX70T is a 1.5-liter turbocharged gasoline engine producing 150 PS and 230 Nm of torque mated to a six-speed automatic transmission.

Kaicene CX70
In Philippines, from 2021, the Berjaya Auto Asia (BAAI) introduced the turbo variant of the CX70 7-seat crossover SUV under the Kaciene brand.

References

External links

Official website (CX70)
Official website (CX70T)

CX70
Crossover sport utility vehicles
Cars of China
Cars introduced in 2013